Hilary Martin Connop Price  (1912–1998) was an eminent Anglican priest in the 20th century.

He was educated at Cheltenham College and Queens' College, Cambridge and ordained in 1937. After this he was Curate at St Peter's, Hersham and then Senior Chaplain at Portsmouth Cathedral. During the war he was a Chaplain in the RAFVR. When peace returned he was Vicar of St Gabriel's, Bishopwearmouth and then Rural Dean of Newcastle-under-Lyme. In 1966 he became Provost of Chelmsford, a post he held for 11 years.

Notes

1912 births
1998 deaths
People educated at Cheltenham College
Alumni of Queens' College, Cambridge
Royal Air Force Volunteer Reserve personnel of World War II
Provosts and Deans of Chelmsford
Royal Air Force chaplains
World War II chaplains
20th-century English Anglican priests